The Four Books, or The Four Principles (al-Uṣūl al-Arbaʿah), is a Twelver Shia term referring to their four best-known hadith collections:

Most Shi'a Muslims use different books of hadith from those used by other Muslims, who prize the six major hadith collections. In particular, Twelver Shi'a consider many Sunni transmitters of hadith to be unreliable because many of them took the side of Abu Bakr, Umar, Uthman and Ali instead of only Ali (and the rest of Muhammad's family) and the majority of them were narrated through certain personalities that waged war against Ahlul Bayt or sided with their enemies such as Aisha that fought Ali at Jamal, or Muawiya who did so at Siffin. Hussain (grandson of Muhammad and son of Ali ibn Abi Talib) was martyred at the Battle of Karbala. Shia trust traditions transmitted through the Imams, Muhammad's descendants through Fatima Zahra.

See also 
List of Shi'a books

Notes

References

Shia hadith collections